419th may refer to:

419th Fighter Wing, United States Air Force Reserve unit active with Tenth Air Force, based at Hill Air Force Base, Utah
419th Flight Test Squadron (419 FLTS), part of the 412th Test Wing based at Edwards Air Force Base, California
419th Night Fighter Squadron, inactive United States Air Force unit
419th Operations Group, operational component of the 419th Fighter Wing, stationed at Hill Air Force Base, Utah
419th Tactical Fighter Training Squadron, inactive United States Air Force unit

See also
419 (number)
419 (disambiguation)
419, the year 419 (CDXIX) of the Julian calendar
419 BC